The S.E.C.A.T.-VI La Mouette or S.E.C.A.T. 60T La Mouette was a French two seat tourer built shortly before the outbreak of World War II.

Design 
SECAT (Société d'Etudes et de Construction d'Avions de Tourisme) were established in Boulogne in 1938. During that year they produced the Type VI, a low powered, high wing cabin monoplane with side-by-side seating for two.

Its one piece cantilever wing had spruce plywood box  spars and ribs and was okoumé plywood covered.  It was attached to the upper fuselage longerons at six points and had a  centre section of constant chord and thickness. Beyond, the wing thinned from its underside, creating positive dihedral and became semi-elliptical in plan. Long (more than 60% of the half-span) ailerons, unusually mounted inboard and gently decreasing in chord outboard, produced an overall wing plan close to the ideal ellipse.

Like the wing, the rectangular section fuselage had a wooden frame and was ply covered. The two side-by-side seats, provided with dual control, were in an enclosed cabin under the wing leading edge with glazing ahead, in the two side doors sides and above, with a panel in the wing centre section. The fuselage tapered to the rear to a tall vertical tail which had a straight edged fin and a straight edged, round topped balanced rudder which reached down to the keel. The curved edged tailplane, mounted low on the fuselage, carried unbalanced elevators cut away centrally for rudder movement. Like the rest of the aircraft the empennage was wood framed and ply covered.

The mainwheels, enclosed by fairings were on a split axle from the fuselage centre, joined through rubber shock absorbers to faired-in V-struts from the lower fuselage longerons.

Development

The date of the first flight of the S.E.C.A.T. VI is not known.  It first came to public attention in December 1938 with an attempt on the world distance record for aircraft with engines of less than  capacity, which ended with a mechanical failure. It gained its Certificate of Airworthiness (CoA) in June 1939.

By July, production of a series of five was under way, though it is not known how many were completed.  Airframe no.2, initially registered F-W134, became F-PAAM on receiving its CoA and survived the war. No. 3, F-PEAB, was registered post-war as a SECAT S.4 La Mouette and the post-war SECAT S.5 was a development. Both the S.5 and the SECAT RG-75  were very similar to the S.4 apart from having Régnier 4D.2  engines.

Specifications

References

1930s French civil aircraft
SECAT aircraft
High-wing aircraft
Aircraft first flown in 1938